Tast may refer to:

 du Tast Lake (aka Lake Tast), Quebec, Canada; a lake
 Tast Fest, a festival held at New Center Park, New Centre, Detroit, Michigan, US
 Carrols Restaurant Group (stock ticker: TAST)
 TAST (Time of Assertion) in linguistics

See also

 
 
 Taste (disambiguation)